α-Hederin (alpha-hederin) is a water-soluble pentacyclic triterpenoid saponin found in the seeds of Nigella sativa and leaves of Hedera helix.

Anticancer studies
α-Hederin and also its derivative, kalopanaxsaponin-I, have been studied for their anticancer activities. α-Hederin has been shown to enhance the cytotoxicity of an established chemotherapeutic agent, 5-fluorouracil, in an animal model of colon carcinoma.

See also
 Hederagenin
 Thymoquinone

References

Triterpene glycosides
Saponins